Bana  is a department or commune of Balé Province in southern Burkina Faso. Its capital lies at the town of Bana. According to the 1996 census the department has a population of 12,299.

Towns and villages
Towns and villages and populations in the department are as follows:

 Bana	(2 769 inhabitants) (capital)
 Bassana	(918 inhabitants)
 Bissa	(357 inhabitants)
 Danou	(1 311 inhabitants)
 Fofina	(189 inhabitants)
 Ouona	(3 170 inhabitants)
 Sienkoro	(485 inhabitants)
 Solonso	(635 inhabitants)
 Somona	(428 inhabitants)
 Yona	(2 037 inhabitants)

References

Departments of Burkina Faso
Balé Province